Elections to Kettering Borough Council were held on 6 May 1999.  The whole council was up for election and boundary changes had taken place since the last election in 1995.  The Labour Party lost its overall majority, the council coming under no overall control.

Election result

|}

References

1999 English local elections
1999
1990s in Northamptonshire